Stefan Kirev (born 14 October 1942) was a former Bulgarian cyclist. He competed in the 1000m time trial at the 1964 Summer Olympics.

References

1942 births
Living people
Bulgarian male cyclists
Olympic cyclists of Bulgaria
Cyclists at the 1964 Summer Olympics
Place of birth missing (living people)